Claye may refer to:
Claye (musician) (born 1982), UK-based Jamaican reggae musician

People with the surname
Hugh Claye (1889-1937), British World War I flying ace
Queen Claye (born 1988), American athlete
Will Claye (born 1991), American athlete

See also
Claye-Souilly, commune in France
 Includes people with first name "Claye"